Peter Pedersen (born 1954) is a Swedish Left Party politician, member of the Riksdag from 1998 to 2010.

References

Members of the Riksdag from the Left Party (Sweden)
Living people
1954 births
Members of the Riksdag 1998–2002
Members of the Riksdag 2002–2006
Members of the Riksdag 2006–2010
20th-century Swedish politicians
21st-century Swedish politicians